Century Financial is a UAE-based privately held financial services provider headquartered in Dubai, UAE. It was founded in the year 1989.
The company is regulated by Emirates Securities and Commodities Authority (SCA). Century Financial deals with FCA, CFTC, NFA & ASIC regulated principals. Founded in 1989 the company’s service portfolio includes investment consultancy, research and analysis, and financial services in equity, share, currency, and cryptocurrency. Bal Krishen Rathore is the Chairman and CEO of Century Financial.

History
Century Financial was founded in the year 1989 in Dubai, UAE. It is a limited liability company incorporated under the United Arab Emirates law.

 1989:Century financial was founded.
 1990:Century initiates trading services in exchange-based products in the US.
 1993:Century introduced Forex trading to private investors
 1999:Century started online trading in forex
 2000:Century launched online trading platform for US equities
 2008:Century provides interest-free margin trading
 2012:Century launched the financial & economic calendar
 2015:Century introduces advanced online trading platform
 2017:Century awarded 'Best Financial Market Brokers, EMEA' and 'Best Financial Brokerage Firm', UAE

Awards and honors

References

Financial services companies of the United Arab Emirates
Companies based in Dubai
Emirati companies established in 1989
Financial services companies established in 1989